Several sports clubs are named Al-Salam SC or Al Salam SC, including:

 Al Salam SC (Esna), which plays in Egyptian Second Division football
 Al-Salam SC (Iraq), which plays in Iraq Division Two football
 Al-Salam SC (Oman), which plays in the Oman Football Association's Second Division League, as well as in other sports

See also 
 Al-Salam FC, South Sudanese football club
 Assalam F.C., East Timorese football club
 Salam Zgharta FC, Lebanese football club
 Salam (disambiguation)